Gozaresh is a Persian language magazine published in Iran. The magazine is published on a monthly basis. It is about politics, economics and society. Its editor in chief is Abolghasem Golbaf.

References

1990 establishments in Iran
Magazines published in Iran
Monthly magazines published in Iran
Magazines established in 1990
Persian-language magazines
Political magazines